Gurcharan Singh Pohli (born June 24, 1942) is an Indian singer and actor who worked in Punjabi and Hindi films. He is best known for his Punjabi duets with his wife, singer Promila Pammi. He was very active in the industry from the 1960s to the late 1980s. As an actor, he is most remembered for his role as Ghukkar in the movie Balbeero Bhabi (1981).

Early life & family background
Pohli was born in village Chak No. 51, Pakpattan Tehsil of Montgomery District (now in Pakpattan District) of Punjab in British India. Due to partition, his family moved to village Kot Karor Kalan near Talwandi Bhai in Firozpur District of East Punjab, India. He married his stage partner singer Promila Pammi and the family is now settled in California.

Career
He learned the music from Ustad Jaswant Bhanwra. He recorded mostly his songs and live performances with Promila Pammi for approximately 20 years. They were one of the most famous singing couples of Punjab in the 1970s and '80s as Pohli-Pammi.  Pohli was always keen to work in movies. Director Boota Singh Shaad gave him first chance in his Punjabi movie Kulli Yaar Di (1969) as a playback singer. Pohli went to Bombay to try his luck in movies. He got a break as an actor in 1974 Hindi movie Kora Badan, which was also directed by Boota Singh Shaad. After that, he worked in many Hindi movies such as Chattan Singh, Paap Aur Punya and Sharafat Chhod Di Maine. Pohli used 'Shera' as his screen name in most of his Hindi movies. He came back to Punjab and worked in few Punjabi movies as well. He is most remembered for his villainous role of Ghukkar in the Punjabi movie Balbeero Bhabi (1981). After that, he worked in a few other Punjabi movies such as Yaari Jatt Di (1984), Patola (1987) and Jatt Soormay (1988).

Filmography

References

1942 births
Living people
Punjabi singers
People from Pakpattan
20th-century Indian male actors
Indian male film actors